Reflections on the Motive Power of Fire and on Machines Fitted to Develop that Power is a book published in 1824 by French physicist Sadi Carnot. The 118-page book's French title was Réflexions sur la puissance motrice du feu et sur les machines propres à développer cette puissance. It is a significant publication in the history of thermodynamics about a generalized theory of heat engines.

Overview
The book is considered the founding work of thermodynamics. It contains the preliminary outline of the second law of thermodynamics. Carnot stated that motive power is due to the fall of caloric (heat) from a hot to a cold body.

The work was unnoticed until 1834 when French mining engineer Émile Clapeyron put it on a graphical footing in his Memoir on the Motive Power of Heat. Through Clapeyron's paper, German physicist Rudolf Clausius learned of Carnot's theory of heat and through a modification of Carnot's suppositions on heat, Clausius put the second law in mathematical form with his introduction of the concept of entropy.

By 1849, thermo-dynamic, as a functional term, was used in William Thomson's paper An Account of Carnot's Theory of the Motive Power of Heat.

The Reflections contain a number of principles such as the Carnot cycle, the Carnot heat engine, Carnot's theorem, thermodynamic efficiency. Similar to how the Reflections was the precursor to the second law, English physicist James Joule's 1843 paper Mechanical equivalent of heat was the precursor to the first law of thermodynamics.

Despite the fact that the caloric theory of heat was incorrect, Carnot's work brought together three insights that remain relevant and were used by his successors to develop the concept of entropy:
 The "fall of heat" from a high temperature to a lower temperature is where the work comes from.
 Analyzing a cycle, rather than an open system, is the correct way to analyze a heat engine.
 The concept of a reversible process.

See also
 Timeline of thermodynamics

References

External links 

 Reflections on the Motive Power of Fire (1824), analysed on BibNum (click "À télécharger" for English analysis)
  American Institute of Physics, 2011. . Abstract at: .
__notoc__
Thermodynamics literature
Physics books